Sweet Home High School (SHHS), sometimes called Sweet Home Senior High, is a New York State public high school located at 1901 Sweet Home Road in Amherst, New York. Sweet Home High School educates students in grades 9 through 12 and is one of seven schools in the Sweet Home Central School District. The district consists of one High School, one Middle School, four Elementary schools (Glendale, Heritage Heights, Maplemere, and Willow Ridge), and one Alternative School (Dexter Terrace). Nearly 4,000 students are enrolled in the District's seven schools.

In 2005, Sweet Home High school was listed at number 810 by Newsweek in their list of "The 1,000 Top U.S. Schools".

Music
Sweet Home has many music programs that includes Jazz Ensemble, Percussion Ensemble, Symphonic Band, Wind Ensemble, Chamber Orchestra, Concert Orchestra, Symphony Orchestra, Concert Chorale, Mixed Chorus and the annual musical.

Athletics
The school offers and competes competitively in a number of sports, including Football, Basketball, Baseball, Ice Hockey, Lacrosse, Cross Country, Field Hockey, Golf, Gymnastics, Soccer, Swimming, Tennis, Volleyball, Masterminds (A team based trivia game), Chess, Cheerleading, Bowling, Track and Field, Softball, and Wrestling.

One of the most notable accomplishments of a Sweet Home athletics team is a streak of 292 undefeated games by the girls volleyball team. The streak lasted a span of eight seasons from 1978–1987 and set a National Federation of High School record for consecutive wins.

Football
Football is a cherished sport at Sweet Home. The Sweet Home Panthers Varsity Football team has won the Section 6 Class A Championship 8 times since 2002: 2002, 2007-2012, & 2014 and won the New York State Championship 2 times: 2008-2009.

Notable alumni

 William Conrad III, member of the New York State Assembly

Dan Herbeck - Buffalo News reporter, author
"Baby" Joe Mesi - heavyweight boxer
Keith O'Neil - NFL Linebacker
KEYZBABY - record producer, songwriter
Laura Pedersen - fiction author, columnist
Reggie Witherspoon - former head basketball coach
Dave Peth - Emmy winning producer

References

External links 
 Sweet Home High School Website

Public high schools in New York (state)
High schools in Erie County, New York